Dwight Willard Burney (January 7, 1892 – March 10, 1987) was an American politician from the state of Nebraska. A Republican, he served as the 30th governor of Nebraska from 1960 to 1961.

Early life and career
Burney was born in Hartington, Nebraska, the son of Willard H. Burney, a Representative in the Nebraska legislature in 1919. He attended rural schools and graduated from the University of South Dakota in 1912. After graduation, he taught in high schools, farmed and ranched.  For 25 years, he was director of the Hartington rural schools.

Political career
Burney was elected a member of the Nebraska Unicameral in 1945 and won re-election until 1957.  He served as Speaker during that time.

In 1957, Burney became the 26th lieutenant governor of Nebraska. Re-elected, he served in that office and became governor of Nebraska as well after Gov. Ralph G. Brooks died in office on September 9, 1960. During his tenure, a state sales tax was promoted, and controversy over the firing of Jack Obblick, the Director of State Aeronautics, was handled.  He was governor of Nebraska until the inauguration of Gov. Frank B. Morrison in 1961, and continued as lieutenant governor until 1965.

In a controversial move on June 27, 1961, while Nebraska Governor Frank B. Morrison, a Democrat, was attending a conference in Hawaii, Burney, at that time the lieutenant governor and a Republican, appointed Eugene T. Mahoney, also a Republican, to a seat in the Nebraska Legislature to fill a vacancy created by the resignation of Senator John P. Munnelly. (At that time, the offices of Nebraska Governor and Nebraska Lieutenant Governor were elected independently, which enabled those offices to be held simultaneously by individuals of differing political parties.) While controversial, Burney's actions were nonetheless legal since, by the absence of Governor Morrison from the state, Burney was considered "Acting Governor" by Article IV, Section 16, of the Nebraska Constitution at the time and could exercise the full powers of the governor's office, including the appointment of legislators to fill vacancies.

Later life
Burney's wife Edna died in 1962, and he married Grayce Hahn (1907-1994) of Polk, Nebraska on January 1, 1965. Burney and Grayce made their home in Polk.  Burney died in his winter home in Mesa, Arizona, on March 10, 1987.  He is interred at Hartington, Nebraska. He was a Freemason.

References

External links
 
 National Governors Association
 

1892 births
1987 deaths
Republican Party governors of Nebraska
Republican Party Nebraska state senators
Lieutenant Governors of Nebraska
Speakers of the Nebraska Legislature
People from Hartington, Nebraska
20th-century American politicians